Carnaby is a family name which may refer to:

People
 Garth Carnaby (born 1950) New Zealand fibre physicist and science and public administrator
 Ivan Carnaby (1908–1974), Australian ornithologist
 Tom Carnaby (1913–1971), British footballer
 William Carnaby (1595–1645), English politician
 William Carnaby (composer) (1772–1839), English organist and composer

Places
 Carnaby Street, London, England
 Carnaby, East Riding of Yorkshire, a village in England
 Carnaby railway station
 RAF Carnaby, East Riding of Yorkshire, England